Deepak Malhotra is an American professor, focusing in negotiation strategy, trust development, international and ethnic dispute resolution, and competitive escalation. He is currently the Eli Goldston Professor of Business Administration at Harvard Business School.

Publications
 Negotiating the Impossible: How to Break Deadlocks and Resolve Ugly Conflicts (without Money or Muscle) (2018), Berrett-Koehler Publishers; .
 I Moved Your Cheese: For Those Who Refuse to Live as Mice in Someone Else’s Maze (2011), Berrett-Koehler Publishers; .
 Negotiation Genius: How to Overcome Obstacles and Achieve Brilliant Results at the Bargaining Table and Beyond (2007), Bantam Books; .

References

Harvard Business School faculty
21st-century American economists
Living people
Year of birth missing (living people)